`Febres may refer to:

People
Carmen Febres-Cordero de Ballén (1829-1893), Venezuelan writer, poet
George Febres (1943), an Ecuadorian-born painter
Héctor Febres (d. 2007), an Argentinean navy officer
León Febres Cordero (1931 – 2008), former President of Ecuador Mayra Santos-Febres
Mayra Santos-Febres (b. 1966 ), a Puerto Rican author, poet, novelist, and literary critic 
Miguel Febres Cordero (1854-1910), religious education leader

Places

Portugal
 Febres (Cantanhede), a civil parish in the municipality of Cantanhede